Orthochilus ensatus is a species of orchid, occurring from Mozambique to South Africa. It was previously known as Eulophia ensata until recently transferred to the genus Orthochilus.

References

Eulophiinae